West Virginia Route 7 is an east–west state highway located in the U.S. state of West Virginia. The western terminus of the route is at the Ohio state line in New Martinsville, where WV 7 becomes State Route 536 upon crossing the Ohio River. The eastern terminus is at the Maryland state line east of Corinth, where WV 7 continues as Maryland Route 39.

Major intersections

See also

 List of state highways in West Virginia
 List of highways numbered 7
 Wadestown Covered Bridge, formerly located along the route

References

External links

007
West Virginia Route 007
West Virginia Route 007
West Virginia Route 007